Molodizhne is an urban-type settlement in  Simferopol Raion of the Autonomous Republic of Crimea, a territory recognized by a majority of countries as part of Ukraine and incorporated by Russia as the Republic of Crimea. Population:

References

External links
 Molodizhne at the Verkhovna Rada of Ukraine site

Urban-type settlements in Crimea
Simferopol Raion